RING is a Bulgarian sports TV channel. It was founded in 1998 by a group of professionals and sports enthusiasts.  It is distributed via cable path throughout the country. RING along with the channels from  bTV Media Group (bTV, bTV Comedy, bTV Cinema and bTV Action and bTV Lady). Over the years, it has used the names Television Ring,  Ring +,  Ring Plus, RTV,  Ring TV, RING.BG, and from 18 August 2015 - simply RING. The channel airs live and recorded football matches of the UEFA Champions League, UEFA Europa League, Serie A, Copa del Rey and others.

References 

Television networks in Bulgaria
Bulgarian-language television stations
Television channels and stations established in 1998